Andile Lucky Phehlukwayo (born 3 March 1996) is a South African cricketer. He is a left handed lower order batsman who bowls right-arm fast-medium. He made his international debut for South Africa in September 2016.

Early life
Phehlukwayo won a bursary to Glenwood High School in Durban for field hockey. He was introduced to cricket by his guardian Rosemary Dismore, who employed his mother as a domestic worker.

Early and domestic career
In January 2014, Phehlukwayo was named in South Africa's 15 man squad for the 2014 Under-19 Cricket World Cup.

Phehlukwayo was included in the KwaZulu-Natal cricket team squad for the 2015 Africa T20 Cup.

In August 2017, Phehlukwayo was named in Jo'burg Giants' squad for the first season of the T20 Global League. However, in October 2017, Cricket South Africa initially postponed the tournament until November 2018, with it being cancelled soon after.

In September 2018, Phehlukwayo was named in KwaZulu-Natal's squad for the 2018 Africa T20 Cup. He was the leading wicket-taker for KwaZulu-Natal in the tournament, with ten dismissals in four matches.

In October 2018, Phehlukwayo was named in Cape Town Blitz's squad for the first edition of the Mzansi Super League T20 tournament. In September 2019, he was named in the squad for the Durban Heat team for the 2019 Mzansi Super League tournament. In April 2021, he was named in KwaZulu-Natal's squad, ahead of the 2021–22 cricket season in South Africa.

On 27 March 2022, in Division One of the 2021–22 CSA One-Day Cup, Phehlukwayo scored his first century in List A cricket, with 100 not out.

International career
In September 2016, Phehlukwayo was named in South Africa's One Day International (ODI) squad for their series against Australia. He made his ODI debut for South Africa against Ireland on 25 September 2016. In January 2017, he was included in South Africa's Twenty20 International (T20I) squad for their series against Sri Lanka. He made his T20I debut for South Africa against Sri Lanka on 20 January 2017.

In June 2017, Phehlukwayo was named in South Africa's Test squad for their series against England, but he did not play. In September 2017, he was named in South Africa's Test squad for their series against Bangladesh. He made his Test debut for South Africa against Bangladesh on 28 September 2017.

In April 2019, Phehlukwayo was named in South Africa's 15 man squad for the 2019 Cricket World Cup. On 23 June 2019, in the match against Pakistan, Phehlukwayo played in his 50th ODI. Following the World Cup, the International Cricket Council (ICC) named Phehlukwayo as the rising star of the squad.

In September 2021, Phehlukwayo was named as one of three reserve players in South Africa's squad for the 2021 ICC Men's T20 World Cup.

References

External links
 

1996 births
Living people
Cricketers from Durban
South African cricketers
South Africa Test cricketers
South Africa One Day International cricketers
South Africa Twenty20 International cricketers
Cricketers at the 2019 Cricket World Cup
KwaZulu-Natal cricketers
Dolphins cricketers
Cape Town Blitz cricketers
Durban Heat cricketers